T. Chandrasekhar Reddy was an Indian politician. He was a Member of Parliament, representing Andhra Pradesh in the Rajya Sabha the upper house of India's Parliament as a member of the Indian National Congress.

References

Rajya Sabha members from Andhra Pradesh
Indian National Congress politicians
1932 births
1993 deaths